NASCAR Roots is a group of regional stock car racing divisions and race tracks running on a weekly basis sanctioned by NASCAR.

History
Known as NASCAR Home Tracks until 2019, the organization rebranded as NASCAR Roots after the 2019 season while covering the same series that Home Tracks did.

List of divisions

ARCA Menards Series
 East
 West

Whelen Modified Tour
 Whelen Modified Tour

Advance Auto Parts Weekly Series

International series 
 Pinty's Series
 PEAK Mexico Series
 Whelen Euro Series

Former series
 NASCAR Baby Grand National/Dash Series (1975–2003)
 NASCAR AutoZone Elite Division, Midwest Series (1998–2006)
 NASCAR AutoZone Elite Division, Northwest Series (1985–2006)
 NASCAR AutoZone Elite Division, Southeast Series (1991–2006)
 NASCAR AutoZone Elite Division, Southwest Series (1985–2006)
 NASCAR Busch All-Star Tour (1985–2002)
 Whelen Southern Modified Tour (2005–2016)

References

External links

Roots